Sawt ( / ALA-LC: Ṣawt; literally "voice"; also spelled sout or sowt) is a kind of popular music found in Kuwait and Bahrain.

History
It is said that sawt was established in Kuwait by the poet, composer, singer and oud player Abdallah al-Faraj (1836-1901/1903). The Bahraini historian Mubārak al-‘Ammārī believes that sawt was known in Kuwait before 1766, and in Bahrain since 1783. Saleh and Daoud Al-Kuwaity were widely considered among one of its earliest pioneers.

Description
Sawt is a complex form of urban music, originally performed by 'ud (plucked lute) and mirwas (a drum), with a violin later supplementing the arrangement.

Two men perform the dance, which is called “Zaffan”. Al-Sout is performed only at night gatherings of men. It is called “Samra” (nightly chat).

References

Further reading

See also
 Saleh and Daoud Al-Kuwaity 
 Music of Kuwait
 Culture of Kuwait
 Culture of Bahrain
 Fijiri

External links
Fan al Sawt music by the Ghalali music and dance group, Muharraq, Bahrain, 2009
Audio samples from Zeryab.com

Kuwaiti music
Bahraini music
Popular music
Arab culture